Lead Me On is the eighth studio album by Christian music singer-songwriter Amy Grant, released in 1988 through A&M Recordings.

Lead Me On was a departure from its predecessor, the high-energy pop album Unguarded. Unlike Unguarded or 1991's Heart in Motion, Lead Me On was not as mainstream compatible. Only three of its songs earned mainstream airplay, all of them insignificantly (the title song charted for two weeks on the Billboard Hot 100, reaching No. 96, and "Saved by Love" and "1974 (We Were Young)" made the Adult Contemporary chart in minor positions). Christian music, however, praised the album. It would later be named the No. 1 Christian album in CCM Magazines 2001 book The 100 Greatest Albums in Christian Music. The title song was featured in WOW #1s: 31 of the Greatest Christian Music Hits Ever.

Anniversary release 
EMI / Sparrow Records released a double-disc 20th Anniversary Edition of the album on June 24, 2008. The first disc contains EMI's digitally remastered version of the complete original album. The second disc contains new acoustic recordings of songs from the original album, which Grant has described as "songwriter versions" that are stripped down to emphasize the lyrics. Several of these tracks feature special guests. Additionally, the 20th Anniversary Edition includes previously unreleased live recordings from the large-scale Lead Me On Tour and a short interview with Amy Grant about the original album. The discs are packaged with a previously unseen booklet of pictures and liner notes from Grant. The iTunes release includes the music video for "Lead Me On".

In support of the 20th Anniversary Edition, Grant recreated the original Lead Me On tour in 20 cities, starting in October 2008. Most of the original tour's band reunited for the anniversary tour. The reissue and anniversary tour were also supported by TV specials, radio specials, and promotional appearances.

Track listing

* Bonus Track on CD version** This song is different from the one with the same name on Grant's 1980 Never Alone release.

The release was promoted in the US by the record company (Myrrh/Word Incorporated, Waco Texas) by issue of a unique promotional CD.  The gold picture CD was hand numbered and autographed by Amy herself and was limited to 4150 copies (catalogue number 9016656472).

Personnel 

 Amy Grant – lead vocals, backing vocals (1, 4, 5)
 Robbie Buchanan – keyboards (1, 3, 6, 9, 10, 11), acoustic piano (4)
 Alan Pasqua – keyboards (1, 2, 3, 6, 9, 11, 12)
 Michael W. Smith – keyboards (2)
 Benmont Tench – Hammond B3 organ (2, 4, 8, 12)
 Shane Keister – keyboards (3, 8, 9, 10), Hammond B3 organ (5), acoustic piano (7)
 Carl Marsh – keyboards (6), arco bass (7)
 Brett Perry – Synclavier (12)
 Keith Thomas – Synclavier (12), keyboards (12)
 Jerry McPherson – electric guitar (1), zither (1), guitars (2, 3, 4, 6, 8–11)
 Dann Huff – 12-string guitar (1, 11), guitars (2–6, 8, 9, 10, 12), guitar solo (3, 8, 10)
 Gary Chapman – acoustic guitar (4, 6), backing vocals (8)
 Mark O'Connor – mandolin (4), viola (7), violin (9)
 Mike Brignardello – bass (1–6, 8–11)
 Jimmie Lee Sloas – bass (12)
 Paul Leim – drums (1, 2, 4, 5, 6, 8, 10, 11)
 Keith Edwards – drums (3, 9)
 Lenny Castro – percussion (1, 3, 6, 10, 12), tambourine (11)
 John Darnall – string arrangements (7)
 Bill Champlin – backing vocals (2, 8)
 Tommy Funderburk – backing vocals (2)
 Chris Harris – backing vocals (3, 8, 9, 10)
 Wayne Kirkpatrick – backing vocals (3, 8, 9, 10, 12)
 Chris Rodriguez – backing vocals (3, 8, 9, 10), guitars (10)
 Diana DeWitt – backing vocals (3, 10, 11)
 Mary Ann Kennedy – backing vocals (5, 6)
 Pam Rose – backing vocals (5, 6)
 Chris Eaton – backing vocals (8, 10)
 Donna McElroy – backing vocals (8)
 Dave Perkins – backing vocals (8)
 Randy Stonehill – backing vocals (8)
 Russ Taff – backing vocals (8)
 Carmen Twillie – backing vocals (8)

Production 

 Brown Bannister – producer
 David Anderle – executive producer
 Michael Blanton – executive producer
 Gary Chapman – executive producer
 Fran Kirkpatrick – production coordination
 Kimberly Smith – production coordination
 Jeff Balding – engineer, mixing (5, 7)
 Claude Achille – assistant engineer
 Jeff Coppage – assistant engineer
 Ron Jacobs – assistant engineer
 Laura Livingston – assistant engineer
 Mark McKenna – assistant engineer
 Paula Montondo – assistant engineer
 Mark Nevers – assistant engineer
 Keith Odell – assistant engineer
 Brian Scheuble – assistant engineer
 Bob Vogt – assistant engineer
 Bill Whittington – assistant engineer
 Randall J. Wine – assistant engineer
 Marc DeSisto – mixing (1, 3, 4, 6, 8–11)
 Shelly Yakus – mixing (1–4, 6, 8, 10)
 Johnny Potoker – mixing (5)
 Steve McMillan – mixing (12) 
 Bob Ludwig – mastering at Masterdisk (New York City, New York)
 Richard Frankel – art direction
 Melanie Nissen – design
 Eika Aoshima – photography

Charts

Weekly charts

End of year charts

End-of-decade charts

Certifications and sales

Accolades
Grammy Awards

GMA Dove Awards

References 

Amy Grant albums
Albums produced by Brown Bannister
1988 albums
A&M Records albums
Albums recorded at Henson Recording Studios
Myrrh Records albums